Yanaqucha (Quechua yana black, qucha lake, "black lake", Hispanicized spelling Yanacocha) is a mountain at a small lake of the same name in the Willkanuta mountain range in the Andes of Peru, about  high. The mountain is located in the Puno Region, Carabaya Province, on the border of the districts Corani and Ollachea. It lies southeast of the mountain Rit'i Wasi, northeast of the mountain T'ika Pallana and east of the mountain Llusk'a Rit'i and the lake Khichu Suytuqucha (Quicho Suytococha).

References

Mountains of Peru
Mountains of Puno Region
Lakes of Peru
Lakes of Puno Region